Gérard Vuilleumier (5 December 1905 – 17 April 1984) was a Swiss ski jumper and cyclist. He competed in the individual event at the 1928 Winter Olympics.

Ski jumping
Vuilleumier was part of the national team at the 1928 Winter Olympics in St. Moritz. When jumping from the normal hill, he landed in the first round at 57.5 meters. In the second round he improved to 62 meters, but fell and therefore did not get past 30th place.

Cycling
In addition to his winter sports career, Vuilleumier was a successful cyclist in summer. For the 1928 Summer Olympics, he was registered as a participant in the road bike race, but did not take part. In the same year he won the Bern-Genève road race as an amateur. A little later, in 1929, after a third place in the amateur class at the Swiss road championships, he turned professional. A year later he secured a bronze medal in the professional championship. In 1931 he won Bern-Genève in the Pro category. At the Tour de Suisse in 1933, he finished 34th.

References

External links
 

1905 births
1984 deaths
Swiss male ski jumpers
Swiss male cyclists
Olympic ski jumpers of Switzerland
Ski jumpers at the 1928 Winter Olympics
People from La Chaux-de-Fonds
Sportspeople from the canton of Neuchâtel